Pixley Falls is a waterfall located on Lansing Kill south of Boonville, New York by Hurlbutville, New York. Pixley Falls is located within Pixley Falls State Park.

References

Waterfalls of New York (state)
Landforms of Oneida County, New York
Tourist attractions in Oneida County, New York